Timmins—James Bay was a provincial electoral district in Ontario, Canada, that was represented in the Legislative Assembly of Ontario from 1999 to 2018. Its population in 2001 was 84,001.

The district included the extreme eastern part of the District of Kenora, all of the District of Cochrane except for the central western part, and a small part south of Timmins, and all of the District of Timiskaming except for the extreme southeastern part.

Geography
Timmins—James Bay consisted of
 the part of the Territorial District of Kenora lying east of a line drawn from the northeast corner of the most northerly point of the Territorial District of Thunder Bay (Albany River) due north to Hudson Bay;
 the Territorial District of Cochrane, excluding the part bounded by a line drawn from the western limit of the territorial district east along the northern limits of the townships of Boyce, Boyce, Shuel, Mulloy, Fintry, Auden, Rogers, Fushimi, Bannerman, Ritchie, Mulvey, Goldwin, Sweet, Hillmer, McKnight, Boyle, Mowbray, Howells, Sheldon, Pinard and Mewhinney, south along the eastern boundaries of the townships of Mewhinney, Bourassa, Tolmie, Menapia, Beniah, Colquhoun and Calder, west along the northern boundary of the Township of Ottaway, south along the western boundaries of the townships of Ottaway, Beck, Lucas and Prosser, and west along the southern boundaries of the townships of Carnegie, Reid, Thorburn, Moberly, Aitken, Poulett, Watson and Lisgar, to the southwestern limit of the territorial district;
 the part of the Territorial District of Timiskaming bounded by a line drawn from the northeast corner of the Township of Harris, west along the northern boundaries of the townships of Harris, Dymond, Hudson, Lundy, Auld and Speight, and south along the western boundaries of the townships of Speight, Van Nostrand and Leo to the southern limit of the territorial district.

History
Timmins—James Bay was created in 1999 from all of Cochrane North and part of Cochrane South. At that time, Ontario was divided into the same electoral districts as those used for federal electoral purposes.

It consisted initially of:
 the part of the Territorial District of Cochrane lying west and north of a line drawn from the southeast corner of the City of Timmins north and west along the east and north limits of the city north along the east boundaries of the Townships of Prosser, Lucas, Beck and Ottaway, west and north al;ong the south and west boundary of the Township of Clute, north along the east boundary of the Township of Colquhoun, and east along the south boundaries of the Townships of Marven, Thorning, Potter, Sangster, Bragg, Newman, Tomlinson, Hurtubise and St. Laurent,
 the part of the Territorial District of Kenora lying east of a line drawn north from the most northerly northeast corner of the Territorial District of Thunder Bay to Hudson Bay.

In 2005, legislation was passed by the Legislature to divide Ontario into 107 electoral districts, beginning with the next provincial election in 2007. The eleven northern electoral districts are those defined for federal purposes in 1996, based on the 1991 census (except for a minor boundary adjustment). The 96 southern electoral districts are those defined for federal electoral purposes in 2003, based on the 2001 census. Without this legislation, the number of electoral districts in northern Ontario would have been reduced from eleven to ten.

Prior to the 2018 provincial election, the Ontario government's Far North Electoral Boundaries Commission proposed dividing Timmins—James Bay into one riding for the city of Timmins, to be named Timmins, and another riding for the remainder of the current district, to be named Mushkegowuk—James Bay. The creation of Mushkegowuk—James Bay, Timmins, and Kiiwetinoong (another new northern riding) were approved with the passage of the Representation Statute Law Amendment Act, 2017 in the Legislative Assembly of Ontario.

Members

Election results

2007 electoral reform referendum

Notes

External links
 Elections Ontario  1999 results and 2003 results

Former provincial electoral districts of Ontario
Kapuskasing
Politics of Timmins